Valéria Benke (26 June 1920 – 7 June 2009) was a Hungarian politician, who served as Minister of Education between 1958 and 1961. She was also the head of Kossuth Rádió.

References

External links
 Magyar Életrajzi Lexikon

1920 births
2009 deaths
People from Tolna County
Hungarian people of Austrian descent
Hungarian people of German descent
Hungarian Communist Party politicians
Members of the Hungarian Working People's Party
Members of the Hungarian Socialist Workers' Party
Education ministers of Hungary
Women government ministers of Hungary